France competed at the 1908 Summer Olympics in London, England.

Medalists

France finished in fourth position in the final medal rankings, with five gold medals and 19 medals overall.

Results by event

Archery

The French team was one of three to take part in the archery competitions in 1908.  They dominated the Continental style of archery, with the 15 French archers taking the top 11 places, as well as 13th, 14th, 16th, and 17th.  The two non-French archers in the event, a Briton and an American, took 12th and 15th, respectively.  The team did not do as well in the York rounds, with none of the 10 French archers who also competed in it placing better than 16th.

Athletics

France's best athletics result was Géo André's silver medal in the high jump.

Boxing

France competed in 4 of the 5 boxing events, not winning any bouts.

Cycling

France took one of the gold medals in cycling with a win in the men's tandem.  Schilles also finished first in the men's sprint, but the final was voided due to the time limit having been exceeded.

Fencing

France swept the épée competitions, taking all three individual medals and the team gold.

Football

France was represented by the two national squads of France national football team & France B national football team. Each faced Denmark in its first match, with France coming off the loser both times.

Gymnastics

Hockey

Sailing

Shooting

Swimming

Tennis

Water motorsports

France had one boat enter competition in the motorboating events, winning a gold medal when that boat ended up being the only finisher in the open class.

Notes

References
 
 
 

Nations at the 1908 Summer Olympics
1908
Olympics